Trollfonneggi or Trollfonnegge is a mountain in Vang Municipality in Innlandet county, Norway. The mountain is surrounded by several other notable mountains including Vennisfjellet and Mjellknapp to the south and Skræmetindene to the southeast.

See also
List of mountains of Norway by height

References

Vang, Innlandet
Mountains of Innlandet